Joseph Chesak (December 8, 1853 – July 9, 1938) was an American politician and businessman.

Born in Plzeň, Bohemia, Austria-Hungary, to Martin Chesak (1824–1906) and Mary (Sigmond) Chesak, Joseph Chesak and his family emigrated to the United States in 1857 and settled in the Town of Trenton, in Washington County, Wisconsin. Chesak went to Spencerian Business College in Milwaukee, Wisconsin and open a store and hotel in Newburg, Wisconsin. Chesak moved to Marathon County, Wisconsin and started a store. He was postmaster of Poniatowski, Wisconsin and served as town clerk of Trenton and Rietbrock, Wisconsin, school treasurer, and justice of the peace. In 1889, Chesak served in the Wisconsin State Assembly and was a Democrat. He was a trustee of the Marathon County Insane Asylum. In 1902 he switched his affiliation from the Democratic Party to the Republican Party. He moved to Athens, Wisconsin.

Notes

1853 births
1938 deaths
Austro-Hungarian emigrants to the United States
People from the Kingdom of Bohemia
People from Marathon County, Wisconsin
People from Newburg, Wisconsin
Businesspeople from Wisconsin
School board members in Wisconsin
People from Washington County, Wisconsin
People from Athens, Wisconsin
Democratic Party members of the Wisconsin State Assembly